Clay Evans (June 23, 1925 – November 27, 2019) was an African American Baptist pastor and founder of the influential Fellowship Missionary Baptist Church in Chicago, Illinois, famous for its gospel music infused Sunday service and choir. Evans released his first musical project in 1984, What He's Done For Me with Savoy Records. All-in-all, he has had eleven albums that have charted on the Billboard Gospel Albums chart over the course of his career. He received a nomination for the Best Gospel Album at the 1997 Soul Train Music Awards.

Professional life
Evans was born on June 23, 1925, in Brownsville, Tennessee, to Henry Clay and Estanauly Evans. He was a graduate of Carver High School, then he moved onto Chicago Baptist Institute for seminary education. He attended Northern Seminary, along with The University of Chicago Divinity School. He was ordained as a Baptist minister in 1950, and he founded Fellowship Missionary Baptist Church in Chicago, Illinois, on September 10, 1950, with five founding members. His sermons were broadcast on radio and television.

In 1965, Evans joined the Reverend Jesse Jackson Sr., to promote the civil rights movement in Chicago. In 1971 they founded the Operation PUSH coalition to encourage black self-help. Evans served as chairman of the organization from 1971 and 1976 and became its chairman emeritus. He led his church until December 8, 2000, when Charles Jenkins succeeded him as senior pastor.

Personal life
Evans married Lutha Mae Hollingshed on October 15, 1946; they resided in Chicago, Illinois. They have five children, seven grandchildren, three great grandchildren and one great great granddaughter. Evans's death was announced on November 27, 2019. Evans's funeral was held on December 7, 2019.

Music career

Evans' music career started in 1964, and he has released 38 musical projects, up until his latest release in 2006. He has released albums and musical works with various labels; Savoy Records, Jewel Records, Paula Records, Meek Records, Blackberry Records, and Pro-Arte Records. His album have charted on the Billboard charts at various times during his career. He has had eleven albums chart on the Billboard Gospel Albums chart, during that time span. He received a nomination at the 1997 Soul Train Music Awards for Best Gospel Album.

Discography

References

Further reading 
Mills, Zachary William (2018). The last blues preacher: Reverend Clay Evans, black lives, and the faith that woke the nation. Minneapolis, MN: Fortress Press. ISBN 978-1-5064-4655-4. OCLC 1030339690.

1925 births
2019 deaths
20th-century Baptist ministers from the United States
African-American Baptist ministers
African-American Christians
African-American songwriters
American evangelicals
American gospel singers
Baptist writers
Baptists from Tennessee
Musicians from Chicago
Singers from Tennessee
People from Brownsville, Tennessee
Songwriters from Illinois
Songwriters from Tennessee
University of Chicago Divinity School alumni
20th-century African-American people
21st-century African-American people